Dorothy Martin can refer to:

 Dorothy Martin (1900–1992), a Chicago prophet (alias Marian Keech) who was one of the subjects of the book When Prophecy Fails
 Dorothy Martin, adopted name of aviator Dot Lemon (1907–1986)
 Dorothy Martin, vocalist in the band Dorothy
 Dorothy McAulay Martin, First Lady of North Carolina